The 1931 North Dakota Fighting Sioux football team, also known as the Nodaks, was an American football team that represented the University of North Dakota in the North Central Conference (NCC) during the 1931 college football season. In its second year under head coach Charles A. West, the team compiled an 8–1–2 record (4–0 against NCC opponents), won the program's fourth consecutive conference championship, and outscored opponents by a total of 278 to 60.

Schedule

References

North Dakota
North Dakota Fighting Hawks football seasons
North Central Conference football champion seasons
North Dakota Fighting Sioux football